"Hash Pipe" is a song by American rock band Weezer. Released in 2001, it was the first single off the band's third album Weezer (The Green Album), and the only one of the Summer Songs of 2000 songs to make it onto the album, although "Dope Nose" and "Slob" were released on Maladroit.

Background
According to an interview with Weezer frontman Rivers Cuomo, "Hash Pipe" was written on the same night as the song "Dope Nose" off Maladroit. The story goes that Cuomo took "a bunch of Ritalin and had like three shots of tequila," paced around for a while, then wrote both songs.

Weezer drummer Patrick Wilson is featured on the cover of the song's CD single. Since late 2001, the band has played the song live with a reworked guitar solo that no longer follows the verse melody.

The song is about a transsexual prostitute.

Composition
With a tempo of 128 bpm, "Hash Pipe" is composed in the key of A minor. The opening line, "I can't help my feelings, I go out of my mind", is quoted from The Beatles' "You Can't Do That".

Music video
The video for the song was directed by Marcos Siega, the first of many Weezer videos that Siega would direct. In the video, Weezer is shown playing while a group of sumo wrestlers are standing in the background. As the song progresses, the wrestlers are shown wrestling and during the guitar solo, the wrestlers play the band members' instruments as the members watch from the background. During the final chorus, guitarist Brian Bell performs a move in which he bends backwards, taking the guitar with him, then thrusts his legs in the way he's bending. This move has become known among Weezer fans as "the impossible bend." 
According to the mini book that accompanies the Video Capture Device DVD, Siega was asked to avoid referring to the lyrics of the song for the video, due to its themes of homosexual prostitution and drug references.

Reception
AllMusic writer Stephen Thomas Erlewine chose "Hash Pipe" as one of the 4 highlights from the album. Paul Brannigan of Kerrang! awarded the single 5 stars and named it "Single of the Week".
 
Slant Magazine writer Sal Cinquemani wrote that the song "is further evidence of the band's punk rock origins, with its crunchy guitar licks and staccato vocals scorched with the residual edge leftover from the alt-rock boom".
 
In 2014, ticketing company AXS rated it as the band's seventh best song.

Track listings
Radio station promo
 "Hash Pipe" – 3:06

US CD retail CD/US retail 7″ single (black vinyl)
 "Hash Pipe" – 3:06
 "I Do" – 2:10

UK retail CD
 "Hash Pipe" – 2:51
 "Starlight" – 3:35
 "Hash Pipe" (Jimmy Pop remix)
 "Hash Pipe" (CD-ROM video)

UK retail 7″ single (green vinyl)
 "Hash Pipe" – 2:52
 "Teenage Victory Song" – 3:11

US promo remix 12″ single (black vinyl)
 "Hash Pipe" (Jimmy Pop remix)
 "Hash Pipe" (Chris Vrenna's Kick Me remix)
 "Hash Pipe" (Chris Vrenna's Under Glass remix) – 4:13

Dutch retail CD
 "Hash Pipe" – 3:06
 "I Do" – 1:53
 "Starlight" – 3:21
 "Hash Pipe" (Jimmy Pop remix) – 3:22

Charts

Weekly charts

Year-end charts

Other versions
Rock band Toto started covering the song live in 2018, before releasing it as a digital single, in response to Weezer's well-received version of their own hit song "Africa".

References

External links
 

Weezer songs
2001 songs
2001 singles
Songs written by Rivers Cuomo
Song recordings produced by Ric Ocasek
Music videos directed by Marcos Siega
Geffen Records singles
LGBT-related songs
Songs about cannabis
Songs about prostitutes